Nuussuaq Peninsula  (old spelling: Nûgssuaq)  is a large (180x48 km) peninsula in western Greenland.

Geography 

The waters around the peninsula are that of Baffin Bay. To the south and southwest the peninsula is bounded by Disko Bay, an inlet of Baffin Bay. It is separated from Qeqertarsuaq Island by Sullorsuaq Strait which connects Disko Bay with Baffin Bay. To the northeast, it is bounded by the Uummannaq Fjord system.

The peninsula is mountainous, with the highest summit reaching 2,144 m. The spinal range splits in two to the northwest of the base of the peninsula, with the southern arm forming the coastal range, the central arm almost entirely glaciated, and continuing northwest the entire length of the peninsula. The two arms are dissected by a deep Kuussuaq Valley, partially filled in the center with Sarqap Tassersuaq, a glacial, emerald lake.

History 

Archaeological excavations in Qilakitsoq on the southwestern shore revealed the existence of an ancient Arctic culture later named the Saqqaq culture that inhabited the area of west-central Greenland between 2500 BCE and 800 BCE.

The world's largest fossil mollusk, Inoceramus steenstrup, was found in 1952 in Qilakitsoq Valley on the Nuussuaq peninsula.

Settlements 
The peninsula is administered as part of the Avannaata municipality. The main settlements are Qaarsut and Niaqornat on the northwestern shore, Saqqaq on the southeastern shore, at the foot of the Livets Top mountain (1,150 m), and Qeqertaq on a small island just off the southern shore, at the base of the peninsula.

Photographs

References

External links 

 Volcanic development in the Nuussuaq Basin, West Greenland

Disko Bay
Peninsulas of Greenland
Uummannaq Fjord